Louisiana Highway 42 (LA 42) is a state highway in Louisiana that serves East Baton Rouge, Ascension, Livingston, and Tangipahoa parishes. It spans  in a general east–west direction.

Route description
From the west, LA 42 starts at an intersection with LA 30 in Baton Rouge near Louisiana State University. This section is named Burbank Drive.

From this intersection, LA 42 turns east and follows Highland Road to US 61 (Airline Highway). In this segment, it passes the Highland Road Park and Observatory and the Louisiana Country Club. Curving to the northeast, LA 42 widens to four lanes and passes through an interchange with I-10 (exit 166).

At this point, LA 42 turns eastward and meanders its way across the Amite River and into Livingston Parish, intersecting LA 16 at Port Vincent. For the next , LA 42 and LA 16 run concurrently into the north end of French Settlement. LA 42 proceeds eastward through rural Livingston Parish until reaching its terminus at LA 22 in the town of Springfield. As of 2018, the portion west of US 61 is under agreement to be removed from the state highway system and transferred to local control.

Future
 Burbank Road Widening Project - Complete Baton Rouge Green Light Project
 LA42 Widening Project - Ascension Parish Louisiana. Louisiana DOTD LA42 Project

Major intersections

References

External links

Louisiana State Highway Log

0042
Transportation in East Baton Rouge Parish, Louisiana
Transportation in Ascension Parish, Louisiana
Transportation in Livingston Parish, Louisiana
Transportation in Tangipahoa Parish, Louisiana